Karl Bélanger (born 1975) is the President of the Douglas-Coldwell Foundation.

He was the interim National Director of the New Democratic Party (NDP) of Canada from January 23, 2016 to September 12, 2016.

He was principal secretary to NDP Leader Tom Mulcair during his tenure as Leader of the Official Opposition. Bélanger was a member of NDP Leader Jack Layton's team, serving as senior press secretary. He also was his principal secretary for Quebec in spring 2009, ahead of the Quebec Orange Crush. He remained senior press secretary under the interim leadership of Nycole Turmel.

He was the spokesman for Alexa McDonough when she was NDP Leader and has worked for the party since the 1997 federal election. Bélanger is a native of Quebec City.

He was a candidate in the 1993 federal election in the riding of Jonquière, and in the 1996 federal by-election in Lac-Saint-Jean.

As a party spokesperson, he appears regularly on CPAC's political panels and on CTV's Power Play, and is a regular columnist in The Hill Times. He is also a regular guest on radio stations including CJAD, CFRA and CINW.

He earned a Bachelor of Arts degree in political science from Université Laval in Quebec City in 1997. He previously had received a college degree in arts and media technology at the Jonquière CEGEP in 1995.

Alan Kellogg of the Edmonton Journal called Bélanger "a Great Canadian" for his longtime work as assistant to the NDP leader.

Bélanger placed numerous times on the Terrific Twenty-Five Staffers List, as put together by the Hill Times, based on a survey of parliamentary staff.  He was listed as #3 in 2014.

He is portrayed by Joel S. Keller in the 2013 CBC Television film Jack.

Bélanger lives in Chelsea, Quebec.

Electoral record

Awards and recognition
Bélanger received the Queen Elizabeth II Diamond Jubilee Medal in 2012. He was nominated by NDP MP Nycole Turmel.

References

1975 births
Living people
Canadian political consultants
New Democratic Party candidates for the Canadian House of Commons
Université Laval alumni
People from Quebec City
People from Chelsea, Quebec